The Minister of Road Transport and Bridges (formerly the Minister of Communications) is the Minister in charge of the Ministry of Road Transport and Bridges, Government of Bangladesh. He is also the Minister of All Departments, Offices and Agencies under the Ministry of Road Transport and Bridges. Although the ministry started its journey as the Ministry of Communications, its name was changed to the Ministry of Road Transport and Bridges on February 10, 2014. Prior to February 10, 2014, the title of the ministers of the ministry was 'Communications Minister'.

Listed here are all the ministers, advisors, state ministers and deputy ministers.

Office holders

References 

Road Transport and Bridges ministers of Bangladesh
Government ministers of Bangladesh
Lists of ministers by ministry of Bangladesh